The 1920 Idaho Vandals football team represented the University of Idaho in the 1920 college football season. Idaho was led by first-year head coach Thomas Kelley in their penultimate season as an independent before joining the Pacific Coast Conference in 1922. The Vandals had one home game in Moscow on campus at MacLean Field, with one in Boise at the 

Idaho dropped a sixth consecutive game to Washington State in the Battle of the Palouse, falling  in the opener in Moscow. Three years later, the Vandals won the first of three consecutive, their only three-peat in the 

After coming up six points short at Oregon to start with two losses, Idaho won its last

Schedule

 One game was played on Friday (at Moscow against Washington State) and one was played on Thursday (against Utah in Boise on Armistice Day)

References

External links
Gem of the Mountains: 1922 University of Idaho yearbook (spring 1921) – 1920 football season
Go Mighty Vandals – 1920 football season
Idaho Argonaut – student newspaper – 1920 editions

Idaho
Idaho Vandals football seasons
Idaho Vandals football